Monster Kingdom can refer to:

 Monster Kingdom: Jewel Summoner, a 2006 PlayStation Portable video game
 Folklore (video game), a 2007 PlayStation 3 video game (code named Monster Kingdom: Unknown Realms)